McKinnon railway station is located on the Frankston line in Victoria, Australia. It serves the south-eastern Melbourne suburb of McKinnon, and it opened on 1 September 1884 as McKinnon Road. It was renamed McKinnon on 14 December 1885.

History

McKinnon station opened on 1 September 1884, almost three years after the railway line from Caulfield was extended to Mordialloc. The station gets its name from McKinnon Road, which was reputedly named after a local settler.

In 1928, mechanically-operated boom gates were provided at the former McKinnon Road level crossing, which was located at the Down end of the station. It was the only instance of these type of gates being used at a level crossing in Victoria. In 1974, they were replaced with conventional boom barriers.

During 1976, the Down platform (Platform 3) at the former ground level station was provided. Just over a decade later, on 28 June 1987, the Up face of the former island platform was brought into use.

In May 2015, the Victorian State Government announced a grade separation project to replace the McKinnon Road level crossing, immediately south of the station. This included rebuilding the station. On 1 August 2016, the rebuilt station opened.

Platforms and services

McKinnon has one island platform with two faces and one side platform. Prior to being closed for its 2016 rebuild, in the morning peak-hour, Frankston-bound services used Platform 3, with Flinders Street-bound services using Platforms 1 and 2. At other times, Frankston-bound services used Platform 2.

It is serviced by Metro Trains' Frankston line services.

Platform 1:
  all stations services to Flinders Street, Werribee and Williamstown

Platform 2:
  all stations services to Flinders Street, Werribee and Williamstown; all stations services to Frankston

Platform 3:
  morning peak all stations services to Frankston

Transport links

CDC Melbourne operates one route via McKinnon station, under contract to Public Transport Victoria:
 : Middle Brighton station – Chadstone Shopping Centre

Gallery

References

External links
 Melway map

Railway stations in Melbourne
Railway stations in Australia opened in 1884
Railway stations in the City of Glen Eira